Helfand is a surname meaning "elephant" in Yiddish language. Notable people with the surname include:

 David Helfand, a U.S. astronomer 
 Ira Helfand, one of the co-founders and past co-president of IPPNW, as well as a member of the international steering group of ICAN, organizations that seek to prohibit nuclear weapons in the world.
 Jessica Helfand, a designer, author, and educator
 Lev Borisovich Helfand, a soviet diplomat

See also
 Gelfand
 Gelfond
 Helfant

Jewish surnames
Yiddish-language surnames